Knut Ellingsrud (26 January 1903 – 24 June 1988) was a Norwegian footballer. He played in one match for the Norway national football team in 1928.

References

External links
 

1903 births
1988 deaths
Norwegian footballers
Norway international footballers
Sportspeople from Vestfold og Telemark
Association football defenders
FK Ørn-Horten players